Lebensalter is a fountain designed by Waldemar Grzimek, located at Wittenbergplatz in Berlin, Germany.

References

External links

 

Buildings and structures in Tempelhof-Schöneberg
Fountains in Germany
Outdoor sculptures in Berlin
Sculptures of men in Germany
Sculptures of women in Germany
Statues in Germany